Hervé Billaut (born 5 August 1964) is a French classical pianist.

Biography 
He continued his studies at the Conservatoire de Paris, where he entered the classes of Germaine Mounier (piano), Jean Hubeau (chamber music), Jeanine Rueff and Bernard de Crépy (writing).

Billaut won a Grand Prize at the "Marguerite Long Competition" (1983), and distinguished himself in numerous international competitions (Viotti, 1981; Vercelli, 1982; Épinal International Piano Competition, 1983; Pretoria, 1990; Tokyo, 1995). He performed in France at the Salle Pleyel, the Théâtre des Champs-Elysées, in Spain, at the Teatro Real in Madrid, and on all continents, notably in South America, China, Japan and Korea. He collaborated with the choreographers Jean-Christophe Maillot, John Neumeier and Roland Petit as soloist of Les Ballets de Monte Carlo and performs regularly at the festivals of Festival de La Roque-d'Anthéron, in Granada, Paris, Toulouse and La Folle Journée of Nantes. He is artistic director of the Rendez-vous de Rochebonne.

Notable recordings 
 Maurice Ravel: 
Gaspard de la Nuit, Le Tombeau de Couperin (éd. REM, 1985);
 Piano Concerto, Piano Concerto for the Left Hand, with the Monte-Carlo Philharmonic Orchestra, dir. Claude Bardon (1987)
 Jacques Castérède: Works for 1 and 2 pianos, H. Billaut, G. Ibanez, J. Castérède (éd. REM)
 Isaac Albéniz: Iberia, Navarra, Suite Española No. 1, Op. 47
 Gabriel Fauré: Works for piano (éd. Lyrinx, 2004)
 Paul Dukas: Works for piano (éd. Mirare, 2015)

Sources 
Biographical information from record booklets

External links 
 Interview on Piano bleu
 Hervé Billaut on France Musique
 Hervé Billaut, Biography on Festival tempo
 Hervé Billaut on Agence Claire laballery
 Hervé Billaut, pianiste et Karine Deshayes, mezzo-soprano on Radio Classique
 Hervé Billaut on Discogs
 Dukas: Sonata in E flat minor, by Hervé Billaut (YouTube)

21st-century French male classical pianists
Conservatoire de Paris alumni
1964 births
People from Villefranche-sur-Saône
Living people